Not Waving, but Drowning is the second studio album by British rapper Loyle Carner. It was released on 19 April 2019 via AMF/Virgin EMI Records. The name comes from the poem "Not Waving but Drowning" by British poet Stevie Smith.

Track listing
Credits adapted from Tidal.

Notes
 signifies an additional producer.

Personnel

 Loyle Carner – vocals, spoken word (7), programming (10, 15)
Jordan Rakei – producer (1, 10, 12, 15), piano (1, 15), keyboards (1, 10, 15), programming (10, 12) 
Jamie Haughton – drums (1)
Joice – producer (3), programming (3)
kwes – additional producer (3), producer (6, 8, 11, 14), programming (3, 11), drums (6, 8, 14), synntheszier (6, 8, 11, 14), bass (6, 8, 11, 14), piano (6, 11), percussion (8, 11), guitar (8), mellotron (8, 11), synth bass (14), glockenspiel (14)
Momodou Janneh – spoken word (3)
Kisima Janneh – spoken word (3)
Sampha – vocals (8)
Elan Tamara Sey – piano (8), harp (14), background vocals (14)
Stevie Smith – spoken word (10)
Johnny Woodham – flugelhorn (11, 15)
Charlotte Day Wilson – producer (12), programming (12), guitar (12)
Tom Misch – producer (13), keyboards (13), programming (13) 
Diana Russell – spoken word (13)

Charts

Certifications

References

2019 albums
Loyle Carner albums
AMF Records albums
Albums produced by Kwes